Aleksandr Konstantinovich Ivanov (born July 22, 1989) is a Russian weightlifter.
Prior to the 2012 London Summer Olympics, his best result was 403 kg (185 snatch + 218 clean and jerk achieved in Antalya 2010).

Doping 
He originally was awarded the silver medal at the 2012 Summer Olympics in the men's 94 kg category with a total of 409 kg (185 snatch + 224 clean and jerk). On 27 July 2016, the IWF reported that, in the IOC's second wave of doping re-sampling, Ivanov had tested positive for the steroid dehydrochlormethyltestosterone. On 14 September 2016, Ivanov was stripped of his Olympic silver medal.

References

External links
the-sports.org

1989 births
Living people
Russian male weightlifters
Olympic weightlifters of Russia
Weightlifters at the 2012 Summer Olympics
World Weightlifting Championships medalists
Doping cases in weightlifting
Russian sportspeople in doping cases
Competitors stripped of Summer Olympics medals
Universiade medalists in weightlifting
Universiade gold medalists for Russia
Medalists at the 2013 Summer Universiade
20th-century Russian people
21st-century Russian people